Liberec regional election in 2016 was held as part of 2016 regional elections. It was a surprising victory of Mayors for Liberec Region (SLK) led by Martin Půta. Půta faced accusations of corruption prior election. Půta remained Governor of Liberec region. SLK formed coalition with ANO 2011, ODS and ČSSD.

Opinion polls

Results

References

2016
2016 elections in the Czech Republic